Qeshlaq-e Shah Vali (also Romanized as Qeshlāq-e Shāh Valī; also known as Shāh Valī) is a village in Qeshlaq Rural District, Abish Ahmad District, Kaleybar County, East Azerbaijan Province, Iran. At the 2006 census, its population was 217, in 41 families.

References 

Populated places in Kaleybar County